The 1848 Chicago mayoral election , independent Democratic candidate James H. Woodworth defeated incumbent Democrat James Curtiss.

The election took place during a time of instability within the two major national political parties (the Democrats and the Whigs). Woodworth's victory dealt a significant blow to Chicago's Democratic organization.

General election

References

Mayoral elections in Chicago
Chicago
Chicago
1840s in Chicago